The proposed Japanese invasion of Sichuan was the Imperial Japanese Army's failed plan to destroy the Republic of China during the Second Sino-Japanese War. It was to be a stepping stone for the Empire of Japan's final control of the Chinese mainland.

The operation started in spring of 1942, after the first phase of operations had been concluded in south China, and continued through spring of 1943. The operation is noted for Japan's sustained bombing of cities in central west China.

Basic plan
The basic plan was to make a multi-front breakthrough to Sichuan from northern Shanxi, central Hubei and southern Hunan. Heavy aerial support and bombing of Chongqing was to support the advance of the Japanese Army and their Collaborationist Chinese Army puppets. Japanese Navy patrol boats from the Yangtze river were to provide further bombardment. Chiang Kai-shek discussed the invasion in his book Soviet Russia in China, stating:
The Imperial General Headquarters sent the order for drawing down 16 divisions and logistics support units from Japan reserves, Manchukuo and Southern Areas (including New Guinea and Solomon islands also) to reinforce the Japanese expeditionary forces in central China area, to prepare the principal force of ten divisions in south Shanshi and other support group conformed by six Divisions of Ichang in Hubei amongst other Divisions located in Changde, in Hunan, for striking Sichuan and the occupation of Chongqing in September 1942.

By coincidence, September 1942 was also the time when the German Wehrmacht was closing in on Stalingrad. The invasion phase was to involve Japanese units first occupying Wanxian, from where the Japanese could advance to Chongqing-proper in echelon. To cut off the escape routes of Chinese refugees, the occupation of North Guizhou was planned, which could be used to stage an attack on Chengdu through Yibin.

The north Japanese army division would have had the option to either advance towards south Shaanxi to capture Xi'an, or towards Hanzhong to take Chengdu directly. Alternatively, Japan could have utilized airborne forces to cut off Chinese escape routes and take the Chongqing metropolitan area directly.

Interests in Sichuan region
Both Chiang Kai-shek and General Wego W.K. Chiang suspected that the intense bombing of Chongqing by the Japanese Navy and the Japanese Air Force was to support the diversionary Japanese operations against metropolitan Chongqing, as part of the invasion of Sichuan. It was also possible that the Japanese army hoped that a terror campaign against Chongqing would force the Chinese authorities to break from the Allies and make a separate peace with Japan.

Sichuan invasion

Japanese plan

According to General Chiang Wei-kuo, should the invasion be successful, the Japanese might have intended to put Wang Jingwei's puppet regime in charge of Chongqing. The Japanese might also have persuaded Chiang Kai-shek to join Japan's Greater East Asian Co-Prosperity Sphere and to even assist in a future Japanese offensive against the Soviet Union in Siberia and Central Asia. Another possibility was the installation of a Japanese civilian or military Governor-General to administer the area as an Imperial Japanese Army fief in mainland Asia, which could later be expanded to include Tibet and Xinjiang as well.

Factors affecting invasion
Due to opposition against Japan from other Allied countries, the Sichuan invasion was not enthusiastically carried out. In particular, the United States' counter-offensive against Japan heavily undermined the possibility of an invasion. Chiang Kai-shek stated:
But in June 1942, Japanese forces suffered the humiliating defeat in the Battle of Midway, and in August the U.S. forces initiated the counteroffensive against the Solomon Islands, with a landing at Tenaru River, Guadalcanal (Operation Watchtower). The Japanese suffered frequent losses at the end of September 1942, and decided to delay the implement of invasion plan for Sichuan. Later in November, the Japanese forces having been totally defeated in Guadalcanal, (Battle of Guadalcanal, Battle of Tassafaronga and Battle of Rennel), the situation was turned around,  with Japan losing all possibility to transfer with impunity its forces in the area (the Japanese were obliged to use all disposable vessels in their retreat, "Operation KE" during the night of February 1–2, 1943, the last part of the so-called "Tokyo Express"). At the end of 1942, the planning for the Sichuan Invasion was suspended.

Last operative attempt to invade
However, the Japanese Imperial General Headquarters was still in favor of an invasion. Hence the Japanese China Expeditionary Army produced a new plan for the capture of Sichuan, which was based on the previous 1942 plan. The May 1943 "Battle of West Hubei" was part of this new attempt to advance to Sichuan.

Nevertheless, by then the Nationalist Chinese armies had the support of the "Flying Tigers" (A.V.G.) of the United States, which was commanded by General Claire Chennault. In subsequent battles, the Japanese army suffered defeats at the hands of the Nationalist Chinese armies. In light of these defeats, the Japanese forces had to abandon a new offensive. During this period the Chinese Army sent seven Army envoys to Yunnan and India to clear the China–Burma route.

In fear of Chinese reinforcements through the cleared route and having sustained much losses in the Battle of Changde, the Japanese army switched their attention to Yunnan to prevent future Chinese counter-offensives from that area.

See also
 Bombing of Chongqing

Notes

References

Sources
 General Wego W.K. Chiang "How the Generalissimo Chiang Kai-shek Won the Chinese-Japanese Eight Years War, 1937–1945".
 Gen. Wego W.K. Chiang, Die Strategische Bedetung Taiwans, Taipei
 Idem. Chinese Communists Modernization Problems, Taipei, 1979
 Alphonse Max, Southeast Asia: Destiny and Reality, Montevideo, Uruguay: International Studies (Spanish translation By Dr. Santiago Rompani and Prof. Alvaro Casal), 1985.

Battles of the Second Sino-Japanese War
Military history of Sichuan
1942 in China
1942 in Japan
Invasions of China
Invasions by Japan